The 1993 NAIA Division II men's basketball tournament  was the tournament held by the NAIA to determine the national champion of men's college basketball among its Division II members in the United States and Canada for the 1992–93 basketball season.

Willamette defeated Northern State (SD) in the championship game, 63–56, to claim the Bearcats' first NAIA national title.

The tournament was played at the Montgomery Fieldhouse at Northwest Nazarene University in Nampa, Idaho.

Qualification

The tournament field remained set at twenty teams. The top eight teams received seeds, while the eight lowest ranked teams were placed in a preliminary first round.

The tournament utilized a single-elimination format.

Bracket

See also
1993 NAIA Division I men's basketball tournament
1993 NCAA Division I men's basketball tournament
1993 NCAA Division II men's basketball tournament
1993 NCAA Division III men's basketball tournament
1993 NAIA Division II women's basketball tournament

References

NAIA
NAIA Men's Basketball Championship
1993 in sports in Idaho